is a Japanese manga written and illustrated by . It is licensed in North America by Digital Manga Publishing, which released the manga through its imprint, Juné, on July 25, 2007. It is licensed in Taiwan by Sharp Point Press and in Germany by Carlsen Verlag.

Reception
Holly Ellingwood of Active Anime praised the characterisation. Mania's Danielle Van Gorder describes the linework of the art as "assured," and she appreciated the "variety" in the anthology. Comics Village's Katherine Farmar regretted the brevity of the stories, saying that although  the author creates a good atmosphere of "yearning," that the feeling could not build enough in the space of a short story.

References

External links

Manga anthologies
2005 manga
Romance anime and manga
Sharp Point Press titles
Yaoi anime and manga
Houbunsha manga
Digital Manga Publishing titles